The 16th Lambda Literary Awards were held in 2004 to honour works of LGBT literature published in 2003.

Special awards

Nominees and winners

External links
 16th Lambda Literary Awards

Lambda Literary Awards
Lambda
Lists of LGBT-related award winners and nominees
2004 in LGBT history
2004 awards in the United States